Peskovatka is a rural locality (a khutor) and the administrative center of Peskovatskoye Rural Settlement, Gorodishchensky District, Volgograd Oblast, Russia. The population was 1,093 as of 2010. There are 24 streets.

Geography 
Peskovatka is located in steppe, 69 km northwest of Gorodishche (the district's administrative centre) by road. Vertyachy is the nearest rural locality.

References 

Rural localities in Gorodishchensky District, Volgograd Oblast